Clearlake is a city in Lake County, California. As of the 2020 census, the city had a total population of 16,685, up from 15,250 in 2010. It takes its name from Clear Lake.

History 
The Clearlake post office opened in 1923, "Konocti" then Clearlake Highlands until incorporation in 1981 when the official name became City of Clearlake. 

The first inhabitants of Clearlake were the Pomo Indians, who named many of the area's features, including Mount Konocti. Beginning in 1821, enslavement and mistreatment by Spanish soldiers and missionaries, Mexican land barons, European settlers, and gold diggers, combined with a lack of natural immunity to European diseases, resulted in a massive wave of deaths. The result of this was massive amounts of land freed up for the white settlers who arrived during the gold rush.

Geography 
Clearlake is located at 38°57'30" North, 122°37'35" West.

The total area is 4.27% water.

Climate 
Clearlake has a hot-summer Mediterranean climate (Köppen Csa) with hot, dry summers and cool, wet winters. Diurnal temperature variation is high, especially in the summer. Snowfall is rare.

Demographics

2010 
At the 2010 census Clearlake had a population of 15,250. The racial makeup of Clearlake was 11,262 (73.8%) White, 614 (4.0%) African American, 400 (2.6%) Native American, 161 (1.1%) Asian, 27 (0.2%) Pacific Islander, 1,805 (11.8%) from other races, and 981 (6.4%) from two or more races. Hispanic or Latino of any race were 3,248 persons (21.3%).

The census reported that 14,790 people (97.0% of the population) lived in households, 366 (2.4%) lived in non-institutionalized group quarters, and 94 (0.6%) were institutionalized.

There were 5,970 households, 1,859 (31.1%) had children under the age of 18 living in them, 1,957 (32.8%) were opposite-sex married couples living together, 1,013 (17.0%) had a female householder with no husband present, 448 (7.5%) had a male householder with no wife present. There were 650 (10.9%) unmarried opposite-sex partnerships, and 71 (1.2%) same-sex married couples or partnerships. 1,898 households (31.8%) were one person and 739 (12.4%) had someone living alone who was 65 or older. The average household size was 2.48. There were 3,418 families (57.3% of households); the average family size was 3.11.

The age distribution was 3,656 people (24.0%) under the age of 18, 1,528 people (10.0%) aged 18 to 24, 3,384 people (22.2%) aged 25 to 44, 4,389 people (28.8%) aged 45 to 64, and 2,293 people (15.0%) who were 65 or older. The median age was 39.9 years. For every 100 females, there were 99.9 males. For every 100 females age 18 and over, there were 96.6 males.

The homeowner vacancy rate was 5.9%; the rental vacancy rate was 12.1%. 7,595 people (49.8% of the population) lived in owner-occupied housing units and 7,195 people (47.2%) lived in rental housing units.

2000 
At the 2000 census there were 13,142 people in 5,532 households, including 3,313 families, in the city. The racial makeup of the city was 82.4% White, 5.2% Black or African American, 2.7% Native American, 1.1% Asian, 0.2% Pacific Islander, 3.7% from other races, and 4.8% from two or more races. 11.0% of the population were Hispanic or Latino of any race.
There were 5,532 households, 26.4% had children under the age of 18 living with them, 38.1% were married couples living together, 15.7% had a female householder with no husband present, and 40.1% were non-families. 32.9% of households were made up of individuals, and 16.1% had someone living alone who was 65 or older. The average household size was 2.35 and the average family size was 2.96.

The age distribution was 25.8% under the age of 18, 6.7% from 18 to 24, 23.1% from 25 to 44, 24.1% from 45 to 64, and 20.3% who were 65 or older. The median age was 41 years. For every 100 females, there were 91.9 males. For every 100 females age 18 and over, there were 87.8 males.

The median income for a household in the city was $19,863, and the median family income was $25,504. Males had a median income of $24,694 versus $18,207 for females. The per capita income for the city was $12,538. 28.6% of the population and 23.5% of families were below the poverty line. Out of the total population, 39.8% of those under the age of 18 and 8.4% of those 65 and older were living below the poverty line.

Government 

Infrastructure 
According to a 2012 road report, approximately 44% of the city's roads are unpaved, including dozens of miles of urban residential streets.

Notable people 
Michael Berryman, actor
Randy Hennis, baseball player, was born in Clearlake

See also 
 Eastlake Landfill

References

External links 

 

 
1980 establishments in California
Cities in Lake County, California
Incorporated cities and towns in California
Populated places established in 1980